Holkham Hall ( or ) is an 18th-century country house near the village of Holkham, Norfolk, England, constructed in the Neo-Palladian style for the 1st Earl of Leicester, by the architect William Kent, aided by Lord Burlington.

Holkham Hall is one of England's finest examples of the Palladian revival style of architecture, and the severity of its design is closer to Palladio's ideals than many of the other numerous Palladian style houses of the period. The Holkham Estate was built up by Sir Edward Coke, the founder of his family's fortune. He bought Neales manor in 1609, though never lived there, and made many other purchases of land in Norfolk to endow to his six sons. His fourth son, John, inherited the land and married heiress Meriel Wheatley in 1612. They made Hill Hall their home, and by 1659, John had complete ownership of all three Holkham manors. It is the ancestral home of the Coke family, who became Earls of Leicester.

The interior of the hall is opulent, but by the standards of the day, simply decorated and furnished. Ornament is used with such restraint that it was possible to decorate both private and state rooms in the same style, without oppressing the former. The principal entrance is through the Marble Hall, which is in fact made of pink Derbyshire alabaster; this leads to the piano nobile, or the first floor, and state rooms. The most impressive of these rooms is the Saloon, which has walls lined with red velvet. Each of the major state rooms is symmetrical in its layout and design; in some rooms, false doors are necessary to fully achieve this balanced effect.

Architects and patron

Holkham was built by Thomas Coke, 1st Earl of Leicester, who was born in 1697. A cultivated and wealthy man, Coke made the Grand Tour in his youth and was away from England for six years between 1712 and 1718. It is likely he met both Burlington—the aristocratic architect at the forefront of the Palladian revival movement in England—and William Kent in Italy in 1715, and that in the home of Palladianism the idea of the mansion at Holkham was conceived. Coke returned to England, not only with a newly acquired library, but also an art and sculpture collection with which to furnish his planned new mansion. However, after his return, he lived a feckless life, preoccupying himself with drinking, gambling and hunting, and being a leading supporter of cockfighting. He made a disastrous investment in the South Sea Company and when the South Sea Bubble burst in 1720, the resultant losses delayed the building of Coke's planned new country estate for over ten years. Coke, who had been made Earl of Leicester in 1744, died in 1759—five years before the completion of Holkham—having never fully recovered his financial losses. Thomas's wife, Lady Margaret Tufton, Countess of Leicester (1700–1775), would oversee the finishing and furnishing of the house.

Although Colen Campbell was employed by Thomas Coke in the early 1720s, the oldest existing working and construction plans for Holkham were drawn by Matthew Brettingham, under the supervision of Thomas Coke, in 1726. These followed the guidelines and ideals for the house as defined by Kent and Burlington. The Palladian revival style chosen was at this time making its return in England. The style made a brief appearance in England before the Civil War, when it was introduced by Inigo Jones. However, following the Restoration it was replaced in popular favour by the Baroque style. The "Palladian revival", popular in the 18th century, was loosely based on the appearance of the works of the 16th-century Italian architect Andrea Palladio. However it did not adhere to Palladio's strict rules of proportion. The style eventually evolved into what is generally referred to as Georgian, still popular in England today. It was the chosen style for numerous houses in both town and country, although Holkham is exceptional for both its severity of design and for being closer than most in its adherence to Palladio's ideals.

Although Thomas Coke oversaw the project, he delegated the on-site architectural duties to the local Norfolk architect Matthew Brettingham, who was employed as the on-site clerk of works. Brettingham was already the estate architect, and was in receipt of £50 a year (about  pounds per year in  terms) in return for "taking care of his Lordship's buildings". He was also influential in the design of the mansion, although he attributed the design of the Marble Hall to Coke himself. William Kent was mainly responsible for the interiors of the Southwest pavilion, or family wing block, particularly the Long Library. Kent produced a variety of alternative exteriors, suggesting a far richer decoration than Coke wanted. Brettingham described the building of Holkham as "the great work of [my life]", and when he published his "The Plans and Elevations of the late Earl of Leicester's House at Holkham", he immodestly described himself as sole architect, making no mention of Kent's involvement. However, in a later edition of the book, Brettingham's son admitted that "the general idea was first struck out by the Earls of Leicester and Burlington, assisted by Mr. William Kent".

In 1734, the first foundations were laid; however, building was to continue for thirty years, until the completion of the great house in 1764.

Design

The Palladian style was admired by Whigs such as Thomas Coke, who sought to identify themselves with the Romans of antiquity. Kent was responsible for the external appearance of Holkham; he based his design on Palladio's unbuilt Villa Mocenigo, as it appears in I Quattro Libri dell'Architettura, but with modifications.

The plans for Holkham were of a large central block of two floors only, containing on the piano nobile level a series of symmetrically balanced state rooms situated around two courtyards. No hint of these courtyards is given externally; they are intended for lighting rather than recreation or architectural value. This great central block is flanked by four smaller, rectangular blocks, or wings, and at each corners is linked to the main house not by long colonnades—as would have been the norm in Palladian architecture—but by short two-storey wings of only one bay.

Exterior
The external appearance of Holkham can best be described as a huge Roman palace. However, as with most architectural designs, it is never quite that simple. Holkham is a Palladian house, and yet even by Palladian standards the external appearance is austere and devoid of ornamentation. This can almost certainly be traced to Coke himself. The on-site, supervising architect, Matthew Brettingham, related that Coke required and demanded "commodiousness", which can be interpreted as comfort. Hence rooms that were adequately lit by one window, had only one, as a second might have improved the external appearance but could have made a room cold or draughty. As a result, the few windows on the piano nobile, although symmetrically placed and balanced, appear lost in a sea of brickwork; albeit these yellow bricks were cast as exact replicas of ancient Roman bricks expressly for Holkham. Above the windows of the piano nobile, where on a true Palladian structure the windows of a mezzanine would be, there is nothing. The reason for this is the double height of the state rooms on the piano nobile; however, not even a blind window, such as those often seen in Palladio's own work, is permitted to alleviate the severity of the facade. On the ground floor, the rusticated walls are pierced by small windows more reminiscent of a prison than a grand house. One architectural commentator, Nigel Nicolson, has described the house as appearing as functional as a Prussian riding school.

The principal, or South façade, is 344 feet (104.9 m) in length (from each of the flanking wings to the other), its austerity relieved on the piano nobile level only by a great six-columned portico. Each end of the central block is terminated by a slight projection, containing a Venetian window surmounted by a single storey square tower and capped roof, similar to those employed by Inigo Jones at Wilton House nearly a century earlier. A near identical portico was designed by Inigo Jones and Isaac de Caus for the Palladian front at Wilton, but this was never executed.

The flanking wings contain service and secondary rooms—the family wing to the south-west; the guest wing to the north-west; the chapel wing to the south-east; and the kitchen wing to the north-east. Each wing's external appearance is identical: three bays, each separated from the other by a narrow recess in the elevation. Each bay is surmounted by an unadorned pediment. The composition of stone, recesses, varying pediments and chimneys of the four blocks is almost reminiscent of the English Baroque style in favour ten years earlier, employed at Seaton Delaval Hall by Sir John Vanbrugh. One of these wings, as at the later Kedleston Hall, was a self-contained country house to accommodate the family when the state rooms and central block were not in use.

The one storey porch at the main north entrance was designed in the 1850s by Samuel Sanders Teulon, although stylistically it is indistinguishable from the 18th-century building.

Interior

Inside the house, the Palladian form reaches a height and grandeur seldom seen in any other house in England. It has, in fact, been described as "The finest Palladian interior in England." The grandeur of the interior is obtained with an absence of excessive ornament, and reflects Kent's career-long taste for "the eloquence of a plain surface". Work on the interiors ran from 1739 to 1773. The first habitable rooms were in the family wing and were in use from 1740, the Long Library being the first major interior completed in 1741. Among the last to be completed and entirely under Lady Leicester's supervision is the chapel with its alabaster reredos.

The house is entered through the Marble Hall (though the chief building fabric is in fact pink Derbyshire alabaster), modelled by Kent on a Roman basilica. The room is over 50 feet (15 m) from floor to ceiling and is dominated by the broad white marble flight of steps leading to the surrounding gallery, or peristyle: here alabaster clad Ionic columns support the coffered, gilded ceiling, copied from a design by Inigo Jones, inspired by the Pantheon in Rome. The fluted columns are thought to be replicas of those in the Temple of Fortuna Virilis, also in Rome. Around the hall are statues in niches; these are predominantly plaster copies of classical deities.

The hall's flight of steps lead to the piano nobile and state rooms. The grandest, the Saloon, is situated immediately behind the great portico, with its walls lined with patterned red caffoy (a mixture of wool, linen and silk) and a coffered, gilded ceiling. In this room hangs Rubens's Return from Egypt. On his Grand Tour, the Earl acquired a collection of Roman copies of Greek and Roman sculpture which is contained in the extensive Statue Gallery, which runs the full length of the house north to south.

The North Dining Room, a cube room of 27 feet (8.2 m) contains an Axminster carpet that perfectly mirrors the pattern of the ceiling above. A bust of Aelius Verus, set in a niche in the wall of this room, was found during the restoration at Nettuno. A classical apse gives the room an almost temple air. The apse in fact, contains concealed access to the labyrinth of corridors and narrow stairs that lead to the distant kitchens and service areas of the house.

Each corner of the east side of the principal block contains a square salon lit by a huge Venetian window, one of them—the Landscape Room—hung with paintings by Claude Lorrain and Gaspar Poussin. All of the major state rooms have symmetrical walls, even where this involves matching real with false doors. The major rooms also have elaborate white and multi-coloured marble fireplaces, most with carvings and sculpture, mainly the work of Thomas Carter, though Joseph Pickford carved the fireplace in the Statue Gallery. Much of the furniture in the state rooms was also designed by William Kent, in a stately classicising baroque manner.

So restrained is the interior decoration of the state rooms, or in the words of James Lees-Milne, "chaste", that the smaller, more intimate rooms in the family's private south-west wing were decorated in similar vein, without being overpowering. The Long Library running the full length of the wing still contains the collection of books acquired by Thomas Coke on his Grand Tour through Italy, where he saw for the first time the Palladian villas which were to inspire Holkham.

The Green State bedroom is the principal bedroom; it is decorated with paintings and tapestries, including works by Paul Saunders and George Smith Bradshaw. It is said that when Queen Mary visited, Gavin Hamilton's "lewd" depiction of Jupiter Caressing Juno "was considered unsuitable for that lady's eyes and was banished to the attics".

Grounds

Work to the designs of William Kent on the park commenced in 1729, several years before the house was constructed. This event was commemorated by the construction in 1730 of the obelisk,  in height, standing on the highest point in the park. It is located over half a mile to the south and on axis with the centre of the house. An avenue of trees stretches over a mile south of the obelisk. Thousands of trees were planted on what had been windswept land; by 1770 the park covered .

Other garden buildings designed by Kent are, near the far end of the avenue the Triumphal Arch, designed in 1739 but only completed in 1752 and the domed doric temple (1730–1735) in the woods near the obelisk. Above the main entrance to the house within the Marble Hall is this inscription:
THIS SEAT, on an open barren Estate
Was planned, planted, built, decorated.
And inhabited the middle of the XVIIIth Century
By THO's COKE EARL of LEICESTER

As well as planting over a million trees on the estate Coke employed the architect Samuel Wyatt to design over a number of buildings, including a series of farm buildings and farmhouses in a simplified neo-classical style and, in the 1780s, the new walled kitchen gardens covering . The gardens stand to the west of the lake and include: A fig house, a peach house, a vinery, and other greenhouses. Wyatt's designs culminated in c. 1790 with the Great Barn, located in the park half a mile south-east of the obelisk. The cost of each farm was in the region of £1,500 to £2,600: Lodge Farm, Castle Acre, cost £2,604 6s. 5d. in 1797–1800. The lake to the west of the house, originally a marshy inlet or creek off the North Sea, was created in 1801–1803 by the landscape gardener William Eames.

After his death, Coke was commemorated by the Leicester Monument, designed by William Donthorne and erected in 1845–1848 at a cost to the tenants of the estate of £4,000. Coke's work to increase farm yields had resulted in the rental income of the estate rising between 1776 and 1816 from £2,200 to £20,000, and had considerable influence on agricultural methods in Britain.

In 1850, Thomas Coke, 2nd Earl of Leicester, called in the architect William Burn to build new stables to the east of the house, in collaboration with W. A. Nesfield, who had designed the parterres. Work started at the same time on the terraces surrounding the house. This work continued until 1857 and included, to the south and on axis with the house, the monumental fountain of Saint George and the Dragon dated c. 1849–57 sculpted by Charles Raymond Smith. To the east of the house and overlooking the terrace, Burn designed the large stone orangery, with a three-bay pedimented centre and three-bay flanking wings. The orangery is now roofless and windowless.

Holkham today

The cost of the construction of Holkham is thought to have been in the region of £90,000. This vast cost nearly ruined the heirs of the 1st Earl, but had the result that they were financially unable to alter the house to suit the whims of taste. Thus, the house has remained almost untouched since its completion in 1764. Though open to the public on Sundays, Mondays and Thursdays, it is still the family home of the Earls of Leicester of Holkham.

See also
Art collections of Holkham Hall
Noble Households – book with inventory of Holkham Hall of 1760

Notes

References and further reading
Angelicoussis, E. (2001). The Holkham collection of classical sculptures (Mainz)
Brettingham, Matthew (1761). The Plans, Elevations and Sections, of Holkham in Norfolk. London: J. Haberkorn.
Cornforth, John (200), Early Georgian Interiors. New Haven, CT.; London: Yale University Press for the Paul Mellon Centre for Studies in British Art, pp. 313–24  
Cropplestone, Trewin (1963). World Architecture. London: Hamlyn.
Halliday, E. E. (1967). Cultural History of England. London: Thames & Hudson.
Hiskey, Christine (1997). "The Building of Holkham Hall: Newly Discovered Letters." Architectural History vol. 40.
Hussey, Christopher (1955). English Country Houses: Early Georgian 1715–1760 London, Country Life. (Pages 131–146.)
Hussey, Christopher (1967). English Gardens and Landscapes 1700–1750 London: Country Life. (Pages 45–6.)
Murdoch, Tessa (ed.) (2006). Noble Households: Eighteenth-Century Inventories of Great English Houses. A Tribute to John Cornforth. Cambridge: John Adamson, pp. 207–31  
Nicolson, Nigel (1965). Great Houses of Britain. London: Hamlyn.
Pevsner, Nicholas, and Bill Wilson (1999). Norfolk 2: North-West and South. The Buildings of England. London: Penguin. (Pages 413–424.)
Robinson, John Martin (1983). Georgian Model Farms: A Study of Decorative and Model Farm Buildings in the Age of Improvement 1700–1846. Oxford: Oxford University Press. (Page 127.)
Schmidt, Leo and others (2005). "Holkham". Munich; Berlin; London; New York: Prestel.
Summerson, John (1954). Architecture in Britain, 1530 to 1830. Baltimore, MD: Penguin Books.
Wilson, Michael I. (1984). William Kent: Architect, Designer, Painter, Gardener, 1685–1748. London, Routledge & Kegan Paul.

External links

Holkham Hall Estate
Holkham Hall entry from The DiCamillo Companion to British & Irish Country Houses

1764 establishments in England
Agriculture museums in the United Kingdom
Art museums and galleries in Norfolk
Coke family
Country houses in Norfolk
Gardens by Capability Brown
Gardens in Norfolk
Grade I listed buildings in Norfolk
Grade I listed houses
History museums in Norfolk
Houses completed in 1764
Historic house museums in Norfolk
Museums in Norfolk
Palladian architecture
Tourist attractions in Norfolk
Transport museums in England
Holkham